Somali Broadcasting Corporation (SBC) is a media group that operates in the Puntland region of Somalia, in particular the three main cities of Bossaso, Qardo and Garowe. SBC's broadcasting area of coverage is estimated at 1000 square km, and this is served by three stations in the above towns.

SBC was established in June 2001. Its first FM radio services were  established in the Puntland region and it was the first FM Radio which could be heard in three cities in Somalia. In November 2001, Somali Broadcasting Corporation established the first television service in Puntland. This is now on air for test and it will go on air completely at the end of November 2018

Collaborations
In 2001, SBC contracted with the BBC Somali Service to broadcast their transmission through FM radio for better hearing. In 2004, SBC started airing Arabic and English programs of the BBC World Service.

SBC Radio has collaborated with some international organizations. A number of United Nations organizations including UNICEF, UNESCO, World Health Organization, IRIN, have their programs aired. Others include international organization such as Care International, Save the Children, and other local NGOs. Issues covered in these programs include HIV/AIDS, FGM, sanitation, and education.

SBC mission
In respect of the current situation in Somalia, and the demand for information in the world, SBC's mission can be summarized as:
 Speeding free and fair information to listeners in Puntland, Somalia and neighboring countries
 Raising awareness in the community of all aspects of social sectors including health, education, and peace building
 Giving fair and confident access to the airwaves for all ranks so as to share opinions and ideas
 Promoting both small and large-scale business by advertisements
 Creating interaction among the war-divided people of Somalia
 SBC is neutral, non-political and non-partisan and aims to be one of the most respected media organizations in Puntland and the whole of Somalia

Broadcasting

Radio
SBC broadcasts from three main stations:
 Boosaaso FM 89.0 MHz, 10.4 MHz
 Garowe Studio FM 88.7 MHz
 Gardo Studio FM 88.7 MHz
 Burao Studio FM 89.0;MHz

Television
 SBC TV covers All Somali Areas and its area.

See also
Media of Somalia

References

External links
 http://www.allsbc.com

Mass media companies of Somalia
2001 establishments in Somalia
Organisations based in Puntland